There is a wide selection of museums in Nicaragua. This is a list of museums and historical sites throughout the country.

Museums and historical sites in Nicaragua

General museums
Alfabetización Museum - Managua
Casa Salud DeBayle - León
Museo Comunitario de San Rafael del Sur - Jinotega
Museo de Antropología e Historia Natural de Rivas - Rivas
Museo del Cacao y del Chocolate - Granada
Museo del Café - Matagalpa
Museos El Ceibo - Numismática, Ometepe
National Museum of Julio Cortazar - Managua

Anthropology museums
Gregorio Aguilar Barea Museum - Chontales
Museo "Cacique Adiac" - León 
Museo de Arte Sacro de Subtiava - Rivas
El Museo de Tradiciones y Leyendas - León
Museo Imabite - León
Museo Santo Domingo de Guzmán - Managua

Archaeological sites
Huellas de Acahualinca - Ancient footprints of Acahualinca, Managua
León Viejo, Sitio Arqueológico – León Viejo archaeological site, León Department
Ometepe, Sitio Arqueológico - Ometepe archaeological site, Ometepe
Placeres Sitio Arqueológico - Los Placeres, Managua
Sitio Arqueológico Quebrada de Arrancabarba - Matagalpa
Zapatera, Sitio Arqueológico  - Zapatera archaeological site, Isla Zapatera

Archaeology museums
Museo Arqueológico César Salgado de Condega - Estelí
Museo Arqueológico de Altagracia - Rivas
Museo Arqueológico de Cerámica Precolombina - Granada
Museo Arqueológico de Pueblo Nuevo - Estelí
Museo Arqueológico de Somoto Somoto
Museo Arqueológico "Gregorio Aguilar Barea" - Chontales
Sitio Arqueológico Petroglifos del Cailagua - Masaya
Museo Arqueológico Tenderi - Masaya
Museo Sitio Huellas de Acahualinca - Ancient footprints of Acahualinca, Managua
Museos El Ceibo - Arqueología, Ometepe

Art museums
Archivo Fílmico de la Cinemateca Nacional - Managua
Centro de Arte Fundación Ortiz Gurdián - León
Julio Cortázar Museum - Managua
Museo del Convento de San Francisco - Granada

History museums
Historical ex-combatants museum - Estelí
Mansión Museo de Granada - Granada
Museo Archivo "Alfonso Cortés" - León
Museo Casa Hacienda San Jacinto - Managua
Museo Casa Natal de Rubén Darío - Matagalpa
Museo Casa Natal Sor María Romero - Granada
Museo de Antropología e Historia de Rivas - Rivas
Museo de la Revolución - Managua
Museo General Sandino - Jinotega
Museo Histórico Municipal de Corinto - Managua
Museo Histórico Religioso de Sébaco - Matagalpa
Museo Parque Loma de Tiscapa - Managua
Museo Precolombino de Chaguitillo - Matagalpa
Museo Sitio El Castillo de la Fortaleza de la Inmaculada Concepción - El Castillo
Nicarao Museum of Anthropology and History - Rivas
Rubén Darío Archive-Museum - León
Rubén Darío House-Museum - Ciudad Darío

Monuments, sites, and parks
Exposition Zapatera Collection - Granada
Masaya Volcano Museum - Masaya
Museo del Arbol El Genízaro - León
Museo Sitio Histórico Ruinas de León Viejo - León
Parque Nacional Archipielago de Zapatera - Granada
Parque Nacional Volcán Santiago - Masaya
Reserva Natural Laguna de Apoyo - Granada
Reserva Natural Meseta Tisey - Salto La Estanzuela, Estelí
Reserva Natural Volcán Cosiguina - Chinandega
Reserva Natural Volcán Mombacho - Granada

Natural history museums
Museo del Departamento de Malacología UCA - Managua
Museo de Ometepe - Rivas
Museo Ecológico de Diriamba - Diriamba
Museo entomológico - San Juan del Sur
Museo Gemológico de la Concha y el Caracol - Managua
Museo Paleontológico "El Hato" - Managua
Museos de Geología UNAN - Managua
Museum Ecológico de Trópico Seco - Diriamba
Sitio Paleontológico El Bosque - Estelí

References

 
Nicaragua
Museums
Museums
Museums
Nicaragua